"If I Was a Drinkin' Man" is a song written by Byron Hill and J.B. Rudd, and recorded by American country music artist Neal McCoy.  It was released in August 1995 as the third single from the album You Gotta Love That.  The song reached #16 on the Billboard Hot Country Singles & Tracks chart.

Critical reception
Deborah Evans Price of Billboard gave the song a positive review, saying that it was a "thoughtful ballad" and that "McCoy has a warmth to his voice".

Chart performance

References

1995 singles
1994 songs
Neal McCoy songs
Songs written by Byron Hill
Song recordings produced by Barry Beckett
Atlantic Records singles
Music videos directed by John Lloyd Miller